Han Dang (died 227), courtesy name Yigong, was a military general serving under the warlord Sun Quan during the late Eastern Han dynasty and early Three Kingdoms period of China. He previously served under Sun Quan's predecessors – Sun Jian (Sun Quan's father) and Sun Ce (Sun Quan's elder brother).

Life
Han Dang was from Lingzhi County, Liaoxi Commandery, which is in present-day Qian'an, Hebei. He possessed great physical strength and was highly skilled in archery and horse riding. The warlord Sun Jian recognised his abilities and recruited him. Han Dang accompanied Sun Jian on his military exploits throughout the 180s until 191, from the Yellow Turban Rebellion to the campaign against Dong Zhuo. He was hardworking and made many contributions in battle. However, even though he was serving in an army, he was actually more of a youxia or mercenary, so he was not awarded any titles for his achievements. He remained as a Major of Separate Command under Sun Jian.

After Sun Jian's death in 191, Han Dang continued serving under Sun Jian's eldest son, Sun Ce. He accompanied Sun Ce on his conquests in the Jiangdong (or Wu) region. The captured territories later served as the foundation of the state of Eastern Wu. Han Dang was promoted to Colonel Who is First to Ascend and given 2,000 troops under his command and 50 horses. In 200, Han Dang pledged allegiance to Sun Ce's younger brother, Sun Quan, after Sun Ce was assassinated in a hunting expedition. He participated in the battle against a minor warlord Liu Xun, the Battle of Jiangxia, and the campaign at Poyang. He was later appointed as the Chief of Le'an County (樂安縣; northeast of present-day Dexing, Jiangxi). The Shanyue – tribal peoples in the Wu territories – were afraid of him and submitted to his administration.

Han Dang participated in various battles and campaigns during his service under Sun Quan. In the winter of 208–209, he fought against Cao Cao's forces under the command of Zhou Yu at the Battle of Red Cliffs. In 219, he joined Lü Meng in the successful invasion of Jing Province, which resulted in Sun Quan seizing all territories in the province which used to be under Liu Bei's control. Han Dang was promoted to Lieutenant-General and appointed as the Administrator of Yongchang Commandery. Between 221 and 222, Liu Bei launched a campaign against Sun Quan to retake Jing Province, leading to the Battle of Xiaoting. Han Dang fought in the battle and he, together with Lu Xun, Zhu Ran and others, scored a major victory over Liu Bei. For his contributions, Han Dang was further promoted to General of Vehement Might and received the title of a Marquis of a Chief Village. In 223, Han Dang participated in the Battle of Jiangling and resisted the Wei forces led by Cao Zhen.

In 223, Han Dang was granted the title "Marquis of Shicheng", promoted to General of Illustrious Martial Might, and appointed as the Administrator of Guanjun Commandery. He was later given an additional appointment of Area Commander to oversee the military affairs in his jurisdiction. When some bandits caused trouble in Danyang Commandery, Han Dang led 10,000 elite troops to attack the bandits and defeated them.

Han Dang died in 227, about two years before Sun Quan officially declared himself emperor and established the state of Eastern Wu.

Family
Han Dang's title and military command were passed on to his son, Han Zong. In 227, when Sun Quan was attacking Shiyang, he did not bring Han Zong along because he feared that Han would cause trouble. Han Zong was stationed at Wuchang (武昌; present-day Ezhou, Hubei) then, and he behaved badly and abused his authority. Sun Quan did not pursue the matter in consideration of the meritorious service of Han Zong's late father.

Han Zong wanted to rebel against Sun Quan but he feared that his subordinates would not agree. He told lies and forced his sisters and female relatives to marry his subordinates and gave his servants to his close aides to gain their trust and support. In January or February 228, he fled to the state of Cao Wei, bringing along his deceased father's body, family members and followers, numbering more than 1,000 people in total. Han Zong became a general in Wei and was enfeoffed as the Marquis of Guangyang. He often led Wei soldiers to raid the Wu border, killing many civilians. Sun Quan was very angry with Han Zong.

In early 252, Han Zong served as the vanguard of the Wei army during the Battle of Dongxing, fought between Wei and Wu. He was defeated and killed in battle. The Wu commander Zhuge Ke had Han Zong's body decapitated and sent Han's head to Sun Quan's temple as a propitiation, because Sun Quan – who died eight months before the battle – hated Han Zong when he was still alive.

Appraisal
Han Dang was known to be a good military commander who often encouraged his men to be united in spirit. He also respected his superiors and adhered to rules and regulations faithfully. Sun Quan was very pleased with him.

In popular culture

Han Dang is first introduced as a playable character in the eighth instalment of Koei's Dynasty Warriors video game series.

He is portrayed by Liu Jun in the 2010 Chinese television series Three Kingdoms.

See also
 Lists of people of the Three Kingdoms

Notes

References

 Chen, Shou (3rd century). Records of the Three Kingdoms (Sanguozhi).
 
 
 Pei, Songzhi (5th century). Annotations to Records of the Three Kingdoms (Sanguozhi zhu).
 Sima, Guang (1084). Zizhi Tongjian.

Sun Ce and associates
Eastern Wu generals
Year of birth unknown
227 deaths
Generals under Sun Quan
People from Tangshan
Han dynasty generals from Hebei